The Sun Odyssey 28.1 is a French sailboat that was designed by Tony Castro as a cruiser and first built in 1994.

The design was originally sold as the Sun Way 29.

Production
The design was built by Jeanneau in France, starting in 1994, but it is now out of production.

Design
The Sun Odyssey 28.1 is a recreational keelboat, built predominantly of fiberglass, with wood trim. It has a fractional sloop  rig, a raked stem, a reverse transom with steps, an internally mounted spade-type rudder controlled by a tiller and a fixed fin keel or optional keel and centerboard. It displaces  and carries  of ballast.

The design has sleeping accommodation for four to six people, with a double "V"-berth in the bow cabin, two straight settees in the main cabin and an aft cabin with a double berth on the port side. The galley is located on the port side at the companionway ladder. The galley is "L"-shaped and is equipped with a two-burner stove, an ice box and a sink. A navigation station is opposite the galley, on the starboard side. The head is located aft, opposite the galley, also on the starboard side.

Operational history
In a 1995 Cruising World review, Quentin Warren described the design as, "a high-volume mini-cruiser designed by Tony Castro ... and another in the French mega-builder's line of finely turned out family oriented sailing vessels."

See also
List of sailing boat types

References

External links

Keelboats
1990s sailboat type designs
Sailing yachts
Sailboat type designs by Tony Castro
Sailboat types built by Jeanneau